Pagglait is a 2021 Indian Hindi-language black comedy drama film written and directed by Umesh Bist. The film was produced by Shobha Kapoor, Ekta Kapoor, Guneet Monga and Achin Jain under the banners Balaji Motion Pictures and Sikhya Entertainment. The film features Sanya Malhotra, Ashutosh Rana, Shruti Sharma and Raghubir Yadav in lead roles.

The film follows a young widow as she learns how to face the family and was released on 26 March 2021 on Netflix.

Plot

A young widow, Sandhya, and her in-laws are dealing with the loss of her husband, Astik, who died after just five months of marriage. Astik's parents, Usha and Shivendra, are deeply saddened by the sudden loss of their eldest son, on whom they were financially dependent. The family suffers, even more, when their relatives come to the house and create a mess. Amidst a house full of grieving relatives, Sandhya yawns through the social media condolence posts and "copy-paste" comments for Astik. Her attitude leaves some puzzled and others miffed. A relative, Ghanashyam, suggests she is suffering from PTSD. When Sandhya's best friend Nazia comes to support her, Sandhya confesses to her that she does not feel anything for the loss of her husband. To get away from the mourning family, she sneaks away with Nazia for a feast of 'golgappe', even as Astik's younger brother Alok performs the necessary funeral rituals at the river.

Sandhya and Astik were never really a close couple in the few months they shared. While looking for Astik's documents for the bank claim, Sandhya finds a photo of a girl in the closet. Sandhya feels anger towards her dead husband thinking he was cheating on her. When Astik's colleagues visit her to offer condolences, she finds the girl from the photo, Aakanksha. Sandhya confronts her in private about her affair. Aakanksha states that she and Astik were deeply in love since college and they both worked in the same company. But he never cheated on his wife, and that they were together until Astik married Sandhya. They could not get married as her parents did not agree to their union. Sandhya finds this hard to believe. The two, however, grow close as she tries to learn more about Astik from Aakanksha.

Meanwhile, members of the family react strongly when it is revealed that Astik had signed an insurance policy for INR 50 lakhs of which Sandhya is the sole nominee. Shivendra's brothers Tarun, Ghanshyam, and Pappu convince him to use the insurance money for repaying his own bank loans, and he unwillingly tries to replace Sandhya with himself and Usha as nominees. Shivendra and Usha, still grieving the loss of their son, try to come to terms with the family's proposal that Sandhya should be married off to Astik's paternal cousin, Tarun's son Aditya, who is unemployed and failing to manage money for his hotel business.

Sandhya asks Aditya why he wants to marry her. He says he is in love with her, which touches her heart and she accepts the proposal. This angers her parents and Alok, who is also in love with her. On the 13th day of Astik's funeral, Aditya leaves hastily. His parents tell everyone that Sandhya told him that she was pregnant with Astik's child. It is revealed by Aditya's sister, Aditi, that Sandhya lied about her pregnancy to test Aditya's love for her. Sandhya goes missing from the house after the funeral.

Sandhya, meanwhile, is ready to begin a new life with a new job in a new city. Even after being a topper in her M.A. class, her family never let her settle for a job. She shares how since childhood, the main focus of her parents was to marry her off, not concerned about letting her be independent. Seeing Aakanksha working in her office, she becomes motivated about working herself and becoming financially independent. She realises as long as she stayed there, she could never live her own life; as in society, other people make decisions for the women.

Eventually, in three separate letters to Usha, her mother Alka, and Alok, Sandhya bids goodbye to her in-laws. Shivendra finds a cheque for the full insurance money, which Sandhya left for him as she believed he'd need it more than her. She also promises to support her in-laws as her husband did.

Sandhya meets with Aakanksha one last time and apologises for earlier her outburst, and gives her the photograph Astik had kept in his book. In the end, she travels on a bus, ready to face life afresh.

Cast 
 Sanya Malhotra as Sandhya Giri (née Pandey), Astik's widow
 Ashutosh Rana as Shivendra Giri, Astik's father
 Sheeba Chaddha as Usha Giri, Astik's mother
 Chetan Sharma as Alok Giri, Astik's younger brother
 Natasha Rastogi as Alka Pandey, Sandhya's mother
 Bhupesh Pandya as Girish Pandey, Sandhya's father
 Sayani Gupta as Aakansha Roy, Astik's colleague and ex-girlfriend
 Shruti Sharma as Nazia Zaidi, Sandhya's friend
 Raghubir Yadav as Pappu Giri, referred to as Tayyaji; Shivendra's elder brother
 Aasif Khan as Parchun, a neighbour of the Giris
 Yamini Singh as Janaki Giri, Shivendra's sister
 Jameel Khan as Ghanshyam, Janaki's husband, who is a banker
 Rajesh Tailang as Tarun Giri, Shivendra's younger brother
 Ananya Khare as Rashmi Giri, Tarun's wife
 Meghna Malik as Tulika, Shivendra's sister-in-law
 Tawhid Rike Zaman as Sandhya's friend
 Nakul Roshan Sahdev as Aditya Giri, Tarun's son
 Sharib Hashmi as B.K. Arora
 Ashlesha Thakur as Aditi Giri, Tarun's daughter
 Sachin Chaudhary as Tulika's son
 Saroj Singh as Dadi Amma, Astik's paternal grandmother
 Unknown as Astik Giri, Sandhya's late husband (mentioned only)

Production 
The principal photography commenced in Lucknow on 21 November 2019 and wrapped up on 12 January 2020.

Soundtrack 

The film marked the debut of playback singer Arijit Singh as a music director. The soundtrack features 24 tracks, with a compilation of eight songs, and four different renditions of the tracks, with 12 instrumentals. All songs had vocals accompanied by female singers, in connection with the theme and storyline. Neelesh Misra wrote the lyrics for all the tracks, after a four-year long hiatus since 2017. The album released on 10 March 2021, through Singh's record label Oriyon Music, and garnered positive response for the compositions, fusing of genres and choice of singers, but criticism directed on the length of the soundtrack album.

Reception
Pagglait received mixed to positive reviews from critics. Certain audiences noted that the film had similarities with Seema Pahwa's directorial debut Ramprasad Ki Tehrvi. Speaking about the film, Pahwa stated that this was due to both films having a similar setting. She went on to commend the actors' performances, especially Malhotra's, but objected to the fact that the film portrayed humour in a family at a time when they had just lost a young member.

Awards and nominations

Notes

References

External links 
 

2020s Hindi-language films
Indian comedy-drama films
Films shot in Lucknow
Hindi-language Netflix original films
Indian direct-to-video films
Films set in Lucknow